Theilheimer may refer to:

 William Theilheimer German chemist
 Feodor Theilheimer German Mathematician